Coal is an album by American country artist Kathy Mattea. It was released on April 1, 2008 via Captain Potato Records and Thirty Tigers. The album consisted of 11 tracks, all of which were stemmed from themes of coal mining in the Appalachian region of the United States. A majority of the album's material were covers of songs previously recorded by other singer-songwriters such as Hazel Dickens and Jean Ritchie. Coal received several positive reviews from critics at the time of its release. It was also Mattea's first album to top the American bluegrass chart and was nominated by the Grammy Awards.

Background
Mattea's decision to make an album about this topic was influenced by the fact that both of her grandfathers were miners, as well as by the Sago Mine disaster in 2006, which, when it occurred, reminded Mattea of the Farmington Mine disaster that had occurred when she was nine years old. She has said that she was expecting a set of stories in the songs she covered on this album, but instead found a connection to her miner ancestors. Her deep interest in this topic was also noted by the album's producer, Marty Stuart. 

Similar interest took place with the recording the a cappella song "Black Lung". Stuart said it would be like "trying to repaint the 'Mona Lisa'", in that it requires authentic commitment to the task. Mattea also stated that it was so difficult for her to learn the song that it took her six months to do so. Nevertheless, the first recording of Mattea's version of the song ended up being kept after it made the recording engineer, whose father had died of black lung disease, cry. Stuart reacted by telling Mattea that this was a sign she was performing the song right.

Recording and content
Coal was made at four different recording studios: Cave 2, House of David, Puremusic and The Playground. The project was produced by Marty Stuart. He was suggested to produce the project from one of Mattea's friends. Stuart told Mattea that she would have to fully invest in the album's material if she was going to "pull it off". Nine months later, Mattea showcased her material for Stuart who approved. "It was like the biggest gold star I could have gotten," she recalled to CMT. Featured on the album were fellow artists Mollie O'Brien, Tim O'Brien and Patty Loveless.

Coal consisted of 11 tracks, most of which were covers of coal mining songs. Many of the album's songs were "more than half a century old", according to USA Today. Among the album's older material is Merle Travis's "Dark as a Dungeon". Newer recordings about coal-mining included Darrell Scott's "You'll Never Leave Harlan Alive". Most of the album's material came from the pen of three writers: Hazel Dickens, Jean Ritchie and Billy Ed Wheeler. All three singer-songwriters had roots built in West Virginia. Among them was the track, "Black Lung", which was about Dickens's brother who suffered from black lung disease.

Critical reception

The album received several favorable reviews, including five stars from About.com's Scott Sexton, who wrote that Mattea brings the album's songs to life and that "you can actually imagine all of these stories in your mind while she is singing." In a more mixed review, Grant Alden wrote in No Depression that Coal was "a complicated conversation, one she seeks gently to engage all of us in," and praised her cover of "Red-Winged Black Bird" as the album's best song. He also criticized her treatment of "Coming of the Roads" as "prosaic" and wrote that she added nothing to the Merle Travis song "Dark as a Dungeon".

Coal was given four out of five stars from AllMusic's Steve Leggett. "Coal won't fill the dancefloors but it will fill the heart with hope and remind that even in the darkest times and places, there's a song worth singing, and those songs, the ones that emerge from the bleakest situations, may well be ones we need the most," he concluded. In 2009, Country Universe named Coal number five on their "The 100 Greatest Albums of the Decade." 

Steve Horowitz of PopMatters gave the project an 8/10 rating. Horowitz called the album "terrific", highlighting the production and Mattea's vocals. "The real question is, despite Mattea’s good intentions and impeccable credentials, is the album any good? The answer is a definite yes," he added. Jonathan Keefe of Slant Magazine gave the album 4.5 out of five stars, calling it "her most ambitious work". Keefe concluded by saying that Coal "is easily one of both Mattea’s and 2008’s best albums."

Release and chart performance
Coal was released on April 1, 2008 on Captain Potato Records in conjunction with the Thirty Tigers label. It was originally released as both a compact disc and as a digital download. The project was the first issued on Mattea's own label (Captain Potato). It spent four weeks on the American Billboard Top Country Albums chart, peaking at number 64 on April 19, 2008. It also topped the Bluegrass Albums Chart and was nominated for a Grammy Award. The album spent two weeks at number one Billboards Top Bluegrass Albums chart and was her first album to make the chart.

Track listing

Personnel
All credits are adapted from the liner notes of Coal and AllMusic.Musical personnel John Catchings – cello
 Bill Cooley – acoustic guitar
 Stuart Duncan – fiddle, banjo, acoustic guitar, mandocello
 Eric Fritch – Hammond B-3 organ 
 Byron House – upright bass 
 Randy Leago – piano, accordion
 Patty Loveless – background vocals
 Kathy Mattea – lead vocals, background vocals, acoustic guitar 
 Fred Newell – pedal steel guitar
 Mollie O'Brien – background vocals
 Tim O'Brien – background vocals
 Marty Stuart – acoustic guitar, electric guitar, mandocello, mandolin, background vocalsTechnical personnel'''
 Mick Conley – recording/mixing engineer
 Kimberly Levitan – design
 Jim De Main – mastering
 James Minchin – photography 
 Dan Spomer – audio engineer, vocal engineer
 Marty Stuart – producer

Accolades

!
|-
| 2009
| 51st Annual Grammy Awards
| Best Traditional Folk Album for Coal''
| 
| 
|-
|}

Charts

Release history

References

2008 albums
Albums produced by Marty Stuart
Bluegrass albums
Covers albums
Kathy Mattea albums
Thirty Tigers albums